Mushir Kazmi (1915 – 8 December 1975) was a film songs lyricist and a poet from Pakistan and India.

Early life and career
Mushir Kazmi was born in Ambala, Punjab, British India in 1915. Breakthrough film song of his career has a fascinating story behind it – Chandani Raatein of Dopatta (1952 film). He was hired by the film producer Sibtain Fazli to write the film songs. He tried and wrote many songs but they failed to get his approval. Finally he was given one more day to come up with a film song or be fired from his job. Dejected and feeling down, he went to the roof top of a Lahore building in the evening and laid down on a bed to stare at the night sky above him. At that moment, the words of this highly popular film song were born.

Mushir Kazmi ended up writing 97 film songs later for more than 50 films during his career.

Death
Mushir Kazmi died on 8 December 1975 in Lahore and was buried at Mominpura Graveyard, Lahore, Pakistan.

Popular film songs

References

External links
Film songs of Mushir Kazmi at LyricsIndia.net website

1915 births
1975 deaths
People from Ambala
Pakistani songwriters
Pakistani poets
Pakistani screenwriters